Portuguese Braille is the braille alphabet of the Portuguese language, both in Portugal and in Brazil. It is very close to French Braille, with slight modification of the accented letters and some differences in punctuation.

Alphabet
The French Braille letters for vowels with a grave accent in print tend to be used for vowels with an acute accents in Portuguese Braille.  (See French Braille#Similar alphabets.  The French vowels  œ and  ä are used for the Portuguese nasal vowels õ and ã.  In numerical order, the letters are:

{| class="wikitable" style="line-height: 1.2"
|- align=center
|  a
|  b
|  c
|  d
|  e
|  f
|  g
|  h
|  i
|  j
|- align=center
|  k
|  l
|  m
|  n
|  o
|  p
|  q
|  r
|  s
|  t
|- align=center
|  u
|  v
|  x
|  y
|  z
|  ç
|  é
|  á
|  è
|  ú
|- align=center
|  â
|  ê
|  ì
|  ô
|  ù
|  à
|  ï
|  ü
|  õ
|  w, ò
|- align=center
|  í
|  ó
|  ã
|}

Punctuation
Punctuation is nearly identical to that of Spanish Braille.

Single punctuation:

The en dash is written on the middle dots, while the em dash is written on the bottom dots.

Paired punctuation:

The two sets of parentheses and square brackets are alternatives.  Many sources give only one, usually the second.

Numbers

The number sign takes the place of spaces within a number such as a serial number.  For example, A (46 1) is transcribed .

Additional symbols:

The real sign is typically used like a decimal point:  4$50.

For arithmetic:

The fraction bar  is equivalent to either a virgule or horizontal bar in print.

Formatting

 is used to indicate that an entire word is in upper case.  For a series of words in upper case, a colon is added:  .

Emphasis corresponds to bold or italic in print.  As with brackets, a second sign indicates the end of the emphasized text.

The lower-case sign  is also used to mark that a line break occurs in the middle of a mathematical expression.

 restores the original reading of a character.

 is optionally used as a column marker when transcribing tables, especially those with empty cells, to clarify the alignment of the data. For example, the first line of the table at the top of this section would be, in a braille text,

References

UNESCO (2013) World Braille Usage, 3rd edition. 
Aprenda Braille na Internet
Vocabulário de termos e expressões empregados no domínio do sistema Braille
1951 UNESCO report on standardizing Spanish and Portuguese Braille

French-ordered braille alphabets
Portuguese language